Deuterogoniinae is a subfamily of moths in the family Oecophoridae.

Taxonomy and systematics
 Deuterogonia Rebel in Staudinger & Rebel, 1901

References

Deuterogoniinae at funet

 
Oecophoridae
Moth subfamilies